Gil Ofer (also spelled Gil Offer, ; born July 15, 1976) is an Israeli former Olympic judoka and coach.

Personal life
He is a cousin of American Olympian fencer Tamir Bloom.

Judo career
Ofer won the gold medal in judo in the under-73 kilograms weight class at the 1997 Maccabiah Games in Tel Aviv, and won the British Open in Birmingham, England in 1998.

In 2000, he was ranked third on the European Circuit in his judo class (73 kilograms).  Ofer won the Judo World Cups in Sofia in May 2000 and in Minsk in June 2000.

Ofer competed for Israel at the 2000 Summer Olympics in Sydney, Australia in Men's under 73 kg Judo.  He came in tied for 13th place.

In 2002 he won the Israeli Championship at U90, and in 2005 he won the Israeli Championship at U81.

References

External links
 
 
 

1976 births
Living people
Israeli male judoka
Maccabiah Games gold medalists for Israel
Olympic judoka of Israel
Judoka at the 2000 Summer Olympics
Maccabiah Games medalists in judo
Competitors at the 1997 Maccabiah Games